Jimmy Owens may refer to:
Jimmy and Carol Owens, songwriting team
Jimmy Owens (musician) (born 1942), jazz trumpet player
Jimmy Owens (racing driver), race car driver
Jimmy Owens (Nelo Ambassador Australia)

See also
Jim Owens (disambiguation)
James Owens (disambiguation)
James Owen (disambiguation)